The anthropology of institutions is a sub-field in social anthropology dedicated to the study of institutions in different cultural contexts.

The role of anthropology in institutions has expanded significantly since the end of the 20th century.  Much of this development can be attributed to the rise in anthropologists working outside of academia and the increasing importance of globalization in both institutions and the field of anthropology.  Anthropologists can be employed by institutions such as for-profit business, nonprofit organizations, and governments.  For instance, cultural anthropologists are commonly employed by the United States federal government.

The two types of institutions defined in the field of anthropology are total institutions and social institutions.  Total institutions are places that comprehensively coordinate the actions of people within them, and examples of total institutions include prisons, convents, and hospitals.  Social institutions, on the other hand, are constructs that regulate individuals’ day-to-day lives, such as kinship, religion, and economics.  Anthropology of institutions may analyze labor unions, businesses ranging from small enterprises to corporations, government, medical organizations, education, prisons, and financial institutions.  Nongovernmental organizations have garnered particular interest in the field of institutional anthropology because they are capable of fulfilling roles previously ignored by governments, or previously realized by families or local groups, in an attempt to mitigate social problems.

The types and methods of scholarship performed in the anthropology of institutions can take a number of forms.  Institutional anthropologists may study the relationship between organizations or between an organization and other parts of society.  Institutional anthropology may also focus on the inner workings of an institution, such as the relationships, hierarchies and cultures formed, and the ways that these elements are transmitted and maintained, transformed, or abandoned over time.  Additionally, some anthropology of institutions examines the specific design of institutions and their corresponding strength.  More specifically, anthropologists may analyze specific events within an institution, perform semiotic investigations, or analyze the mechanisms by which knowledge and culture are organized and dispersed.

In all manifestations of institutional anthropology, participant observation is critical to understanding the intricacies of the way an institution works and the consequences of actions taken by individuals within it.  Simultaneously, anthropology of institutions extends beyond examination of the commonplace involvement of individuals in institutions to discover how and why the organizational principles evolved in the manner that they did.

Common considerations taken by anthropologists in studying institutions include the physical location at which a researcher places themselves, as important interactions often take place in private, and the fact that the members of an institution are often being examined in their workplace and may not have much idle time to discuss the details of their everyday endeavors.  The ability of individuals to present the workings of an institution in a particular light or frame must additionally be taken into account when using interviews and document analysis to understand an institution, as the involvement of an anthropologist may be met with distrust when information being released to the public isn’t directly controlled by the institution and could potentially be damaging.

References

Anthropology
Organizational studies
Symbolic anthropology